The Drake class was a class of three sloops of wooden construction built for the Royal Navy during 1741. All were ordered in 1740, and were the first to be built by contract with commercial builders, although they were to a common design prepared by Jacob Allin, the Surveyor of the Navy. They were the first new sloops to be built since the previous batch of eight in 1732 (which had all been built in the Royal Dockyards), but they closely followed the characteristics of their predecessors.

Although initially armed with eight 4-pounder guns, this class was built with seven pairs of gunports on the upper deck (each port flanked by two pairs of row-ports), and the two survivors in 1744 had their ordnance increased to ten guns.

Vessels

References 
 
 McLaughlan, Ian. The Sloop of War 1650-1763. Seaforth Publishing, 2014. .
 Winfield, Rif. British Warships in the Age of Sail 1714-1792: Design, Construction, Careers and Fates. Seaforth Publishing, 2007. .

Sloop classes